WCIT may refer to:

 Worshipful Company of Information Technologists
 World Information Technology and Services Alliance
 World Conference on International Telecommunications
 WCIT (AM), an AM radio station (940 AM) located in Lima, Ohio also an FM radio station in Lima, Ohio (98.5 FM)
 WCIT-FM, a radio station (106.3 FM) licensed to serve Oneida, New York, United States
 WCDV-FM, a radio station (90.1 FM) licensed to serve Trout Run, Pennsylvania, United States, which held the call sign WCIT or WCIT-FM from 2001 to 2016